Nathaniel Beverly Smith (April 26, 1935 – August 18, 2019) was an American professional baseball player, a catcher whose career was confined to minor league baseball except for a five-game Major League stint with the Baltimore Orioles at the end of the  season.

Born in Chicago, Smith attended Tennessee State University. His professional career (1956–59; 1961–64) was spent in the Brooklyn/Los Angeles Dodgers' organization until the Orioles purchased his contract from the Triple-A Omaha Dodgers in September 1962. In his first MLB at bat, Smith pinch hit for Oriole pitcher Wes Stock and singled off left-hander Ted Bowsfield of the Los Angeles Angels. He would collect one more hit, a double off another lefty, Jack Kralick of the Minnesota Twins, in his last MLB game.

References

External links
Career record and playing statistics from Baseball Reference

1935 births
2019 deaths
20th-century African-American sportspeople
21st-century African-American people
African-American baseball players
Baltimore Orioles players
Baseball players from Illinois
Dallas Rangers players
Green Bay Bluejays players
Knoxville Smokies players
Kokomo Dodgers players
Macon Dodgers players
Major League Baseball catchers
Omaha Dodgers players
Reno Silver Sox players
Rochester Red Wings players
Toronto Maple Leafs (International League) players